Events from the year 1785 in Russia

Incumbents
 Monarch – Catherine II

Events
 Babolovo Palace completed
 Battle of the Sunja - Russian defeat in Chechen uprising led by Sheikh Mansur
 Billings Expedition authorized to search for the Northeast Passage
 Caucasus Viceroyalty (1785–96) established
 Charter to the Gentry codified rights of nobility
 City Dumas established in Moscow, Saint Petersburg, and other cities by imperial decree
 Great Gostiny Dvor shopping arcade opened in Saint Petersburg
 Hermitage Theatre opened
 Odigitrievsky Cathedral completed
 Trinity Church, Pervitino founded

Births
 Stepan Nikitich Begichev - soldier and memoirist
 Dmitry Bludov - government official and writer
 Nikolai Islenev - general
 Stepan Khilkov - general
 Dorothea Lieven - noblewoman, socialite
 Elena Aleksandrovna Naryshkina - noblewoman
 Lev Naryshkin - general
 Anna Orlova-Chesmenskaya - noblewoman, philanthropist
 Konstantin von Benckendorff - diplomat and general
 Hans Karl von Diebitsch - general

Deaths
 Praskovya Bruce - lady-in-waiting and confidant of Catherine the Great
 Ivan Firsov - painter
 Ivan Grigorovich-Barsky - architect

References

1785 in Russia
Years of the 18th century in the Russian Empire